Clostridium is a genus of anaerobic, Gram-positive bacteria. Species of Clostridium inhabit soils and the intestinal tract of animals, including humans. This genus includes several significant human pathogens, including the causative agents of botulism and tetanus. It also formerly included an important cause of diarrhea, Clostridioides difficile, which was reclassified into the Clostridioides genus in 2016.

History 
In the late 1700s, Germany experienced several outbreaks of an illness connected to eating sure sausages. In 1817, the German neurologist Justinus Kerner detected rod-shaped cells in his investigations into this so-called sausage poisoning. In 1897, the Belgian biology professor Emile van Ermengem published his finding of an endospore-forming organism he isolated from spoiled ham. Biologists classified van Ermengem's discovery along with other known gram-positive spore formers in the genus Bacillus. This classification presented problems, however, because the isolate grew only in anaerobic conditions, but Bacillus grew well in oxygen.

Circa 1880, in the course of studying fermentation and butyric acid synthesis, a scientist surnamed Prazmowski first assigned a binomial name to Clostridium butyricum. The mechanisms of anaerobic respiration were still not yet well elucidated at that time, so taxonomy of anaerobes was still developing.

In 1924, Ida A. Bengtson separated van Ermengem's microorganisms from the Bacillus group and assigned them to the genus Clostridium. By Bengtson's classification scheme, Clostridium contained all of the anaerobic endospore-forming rod-shaped bacteria, except the genus Desulfotomaculum.

Taxonomy

As of October 2022, there are 164 validly published species in Clostridium.

The genus, as traditionally defined, contains many organisms not closely related to its type species. The issue was originally illustrated in full detail by a rRNA phylogeny from Collins 1994, which split the traditional genus (now corresponding to a large slice of Clostridia) into twenty clusters, with cluster I containing the type species and its close relatives. Over the years, this has resulted in many new genera being split out, with the ultimate goal of constraining Clostridium to cluster I.

"Clostridium" cluster XIVa and "Clostridium" cluster IV efficiently ferment plant polysaccharide composing dietary fiber, making them important and abundant taxa in the rumen and the human large intestine. As mentioned before, these clusters are not part of current Clostridium, and use of these terms should be avoided due to ambiguous or inconsistent usage.

Biochemistry
Species of Clostridium are obligate anaerobe and capable of producing endospores. They generally stain gram-positive, but as well as Bacillus, are often described as Gram-variable, because they show an increasing number of gram-negative cells as the culture ages.
The normal, reproducing cells of Clostridium, called the vegetative form, are rod-shaped, which gives them their name, from the Greek κλωστήρ or spindle. Clostridium Endospores have a distinct bowling pin or bottle shape, distinguishing them from other bacterial endospores, which are usually ovoid in shape. The Schaeffer-Fulton stain (0.5% malachite green in water) can be used to distinguish endospores of Bacillus and Clostridium from other microorganisms.

Clostridium can be differentiated from the also Endspore forming genus Bacillus by its obligate anaerobic growth, the shape of endospores and the lack of catalase. Species of Desulfotomaculum form similar endospores and can be distinguished by their requirement for sulfur.
Glycolysis and fermentation of pyruvic acid by Clostridia yield the end products butyric acid, butanol, acetone, isopropanol, and carbon dioxide.

There is a commercially available polymerase chain reaction (PCR) test kit (Bactotype) for the detection of C. perfringens and other pathogenic bacteria.

Biology and pathogenesis
Clostridium species are readily found inhabiting soils and intestinal tracts. Clostridium species are also a normal inhabitant of the healthy lower reproductive tract of females.

The main species responsible for disease in humans are:
 Clostridium botulinum can produce botulinum toxin in food or wounds and can cause botulism. This same toxin is known as Botox and is used in cosmetic surgery to paralyze facial muscles to reduce the signs of aging; it also has numerous other therapeutic uses.
 Clostridium perfringens causes a wide range of symptoms, from food poisoning to cellulitis, fasciitis, necrotic enteritis and gas gangrene.
 Clostridium tetani causes tetanus.
Several more pathogens were previously described in Clostridium, but have been moved to other genera with additional research.
 Clostridium difficile, now placed in Clostridioides.
 Clostridium histolyticum, now placed in Hathewaya.
 Clostridium sordellii, now placed in Paeniclostridium, can cause a fatal infection in exceptionally rare cases after medical abortions.

Treatment 
In general, the treatment of clostridial infection is high-dose penicillin G, to which the organism has remained susceptible. Clostridium welchii and Clostridium tetani respond to sulfonamides. Clostridia are also susceptible to tetracyclines, carbapenems (imipenem), metronidazole, vancomycin, and chloramphenicol.

The vegetative cells of clostridia are heat-labile and are killed by short heating at temperatures above 72–75 °C. The thermal destruction of Clostridium spores requires higher temperatures (above 121.1 °C, for example in an autoclave) and longer cooking times (20 min, with a few exceptional cases of > 50 min recorded in the literature). Clostridia and Bacilli are quite radiation-resistant, requiring doses of about 30 kGy, which is a serious obstacle to the development of shelf-stable irradiated foods for general use in the retail market. The addition of lysozyme, nitrate, nitrite and propionic acid salts inhibits clostridia in various foods.

Fructooligosaccharides (fructans) such as inulin, occurring in relatively large amounts in a number of foods such as chicory, garlic, onion, leek, artichoke, and asparagus, have a prebiotic or bifidogenic effect, selectively promoting the growth and metabolism of beneficial bacteria in the colon, such as bifidobacteria and lactobacilli, while inhibiting harmful ones, such as clostridia, fusobacteria, and bacteroides.

Use 
 Clostridium thermocellum can use lignocellulosic waste and generate ethanol, thus making it a possible candidate for use in production of ethanol fuel. It also has no oxygen requirement and is thermophilic, which reduces cooling cost.
 Clostridium acetobutylicum was first used by Chaim Weizmann to produce acetone and biobutanol from starch in 1916 for the production of cordite (smokeless gunpowder).
 Clostridium botulinum produces a potentially lethal neurotoxin used in a diluted form in the drug Botox, which is carefully injected to nerves in the face, which prevents the movement of the expressive muscles of the forehead, to delay the wrinkling effect of aging. It is also used to treat spasmodic torticollis and provides relief for around 12 to 16 weeks.
 Clostridium butyricum MIYAIRI 588 strain is marketed in Japan, Korea, and China for Clostridium difficile prophylaxis due to its reported ability to interfere with the growth of the latter.
 Clostridium histolyticum has been used as a source of the enzyme collagenase, which degrades animal tissue. Clostridium species excrete collagenase to eat through tissue and, thus, help the pathogen spread throughout the body. The medical profession uses collagenase for the same reason in the débridement of infected wounds. Hyaluronidase, deoxyribonuclease, lecithinase, leukocidin, protease, lipase, and hemolysin are also produced by some clostridia that cause gas gangrene.
 Clostridium ljungdahlii, recently discovered in commercial chicken wastes, can produce ethanol from single-carbon sources including synthesis gas, a mixture of carbon monoxide and hydrogen, that can be generated from the partial combustion of either fossil fuels or biomass.
 Clostridium butyricum converts glycerol to 1,3-propanediol.
 Genes from Clostridium thermocellum have been inserted into transgenic mice to allow the production of endoglucanase. The experiment was intended to learn more about how the digestive capacity of monogastric animals could be improved. 
 Nonpathogenic strains of Clostridium may help in the treatment of diseases such as cancer. Research shows that Clostridium can selectively target cancer cells. Some strains can enter and replicate within solid tumors. Clostridium could, therefore, be used to deliver therapeutic proteins to tumours. This use of Clostridium has been demonstrated in a variety of preclinical models.
 Mixtures of Clostridium species, such as Clostridium beijerinckii, Clostridium butyricum, and species from other genera have been shown to produce biohydrogen from yeast waste.

References

External links 
 Clostridium genomes and related information at PATRIC, a Bioinformatics Resource Center funded by NIAID
 Todar's Online Textbook of Bacteriology
 UK Clostridium difficile Support Group
 Pathema-Clostridium Resource
 Water analysis: Clostridium video

 
Gram-positive bacteria
Gut flora bacteria
Pathogenic bacteria
Bacteria genera